George John Hurst (27 October 1914 – February 2002) was an English footballer who played as a centre half.

Career
In May 1933, Hurst signed for Bolton Wanderers from Lever Bridge Juniors. Hurst made 60 Football League appearances for Bolton, scoring twice. A period of Hurst's time at the club was taken up by World War II. Hurst, alongside 16 other Bolton players, joined the 53rd (Bolton) Field Regiment, Royal Artillery. During Hurst's time in World War II, his only son died from a burst appendix as well as Hurst himself suffering hearing loss during the Battle of Monte Cassino. In February 1947, Hurst joined Oldham Athletic, making 98 league appearances. In 1951, Hurst joined Chelmsford City, before retiring at the end of the season.

References

1914 births
2002 deaths
Association football defenders
English footballers
People from Little Lever
Bolton Wanderers F.C. players
Oldham Athletic A.F.C. players
Chelmsford City F.C. players
English Football League players
British Army personnel of World War II
Royal Artillery soldiers